Macrozamia parcifolia is a species of plant in the family Zamiaceae. It is endemic to Australia.

References

parcifolia
Flora of Queensland
Vulnerable flora of Australia
Nature Conservation Act vulnerable biota
Taxonomy articles created by Polbot
Taxa named by Paul Irwin Forster
Taxa named by David L. Jones (botanist)